The  2004 Beijing Guoan F.C. season  was their 1st season in the Chinese Super League and 14th consecutive season in the top flight of Chinese football. They competed in the Chinese Super League, FA Cup and Super League Cup.

First team
As of September 9, 2004

Competitions

Chinese Super League

Matches

Chinese FA Cup

Chinese Super League Cup

References

Beijing Guoan F.C. seasons
Chinese football clubs 2004 season